Rosa Luini (born 20 July 1989), best known as Rose Villain, is an Italian singer-songwriter.

Villain achieved popularity first in 2016, thanks to the certified platinum single Don Medellín together with Italian rapper Salmo and then in 2020 with the certified quadruple platinum single Chico, together the Italian rapper Guè Pequeno. In 2021 she collaborated once again with Guè Pequeno first on the song Elvis and then on the certified platinum single Piango Sulla Lambo. In 2022 her single Michelle Pfeiffer together Italian rapper Tony Effe is certified Gold. Furthermore, Rose Villain signed a deal with the Italian hip hop label Machete Empire Records and also the signed a record deal with Republic Records.

Early life 
Rosa is the daughter of Milanese entrepreneur Franco Luini, founder of the fashion brand Tucano, and Fernanda Melloni. Born and raised in Milan, she discovered her predisposition for singing in elementary schools. She spent her life in Milan together with her family and her younger brother Alessandro; at age 18, she moved to Los Angeles, where she studied contemporary music at the Musicians Institute of Hollywood, majoring in rock music. Rose studied musical instruments and was encouraged by her teachers to write lyrics. While living in Los Angeles, she sung for a punk rock cover band called The Villains, from which her stage name, Rose Villain, was inspired. She later moved to New York City, where she completed her studies in Broadway. After completing her studies, she met her first managers: Mark Gartenberg, a former A&R for Sony Music Entertainment, and Eric Beall, ex-vice president creative of Sony ATV. She then signed with their company, but reportedly decided to leave it after about a year. 

As she met her executive producer, the Italian multiplatinum producer SIXPM, the two became engaged. The two married on May 28th 2022 in New York.

Career

2016–2017: Debut singles

In 2016, she signed with the famous Italian hip hop independent label Machete Empire Records, becoming the first female artist of the roster. On 19 July of the same year, she released her debut single, "Get the Fuck Out of My Pool", which mixed electronic music and hip hop; the music video of the song was shot between Brooklyn and Manhattan. A couple of months later, she released her second single, "Geisha", which earned her the title "Artist of the Month" on the Italian MTV New Generation. On 11 November 2016, the Italian rapper Salmo released the single "Don Medellín", featuring Rose Villain, for the re-release of his album Hellvisback; it peaked at number 13 on FIMI's singles chart and was certified platinum, in addition to being viewed over 16 million views on YouTube.

In 2017, Villain signed a distribution deal with Universal Music Germany; through the label, she released the a remix of "Geisha", who was remixed by Swanky Tunes. In the same year, she released the singles "Kitty Kitty" and "Don't Call The Po-Po", shooting and directing the latter's music video in New York. In 2020, "Don't Call The Po-Po" was included in the soundtrack of the second season of L.A.'s Finest. The first singles immediately caught the attention of Eddie O'Loughlin of Republic Records, who decided to meet Rose Villain and offer her a record deal. 2017 is also a very difficult year for Villain, due to the untimely death of her mother.

2018–2019: Signing with Republic Records
In early 2018, she announced the signing with Republic Records, becoming the first Italian artist to sign a record deal with the label. The first single with Republic Records, "Funeral Party", was released on 20 July 2018 and was a mix between pop and dancehall, the music video of the song was directed by the same Villain and was shot in Kingston, Jamaica. Later that sae year, she signed with Next Model Management. On 26 July 2019, she released her second single with Republic Records called "Swoop!", produced by Sidney Swift and Sixpm; it contained a sample of Whoomp! (There It Is) by Tag Team. She also released "Kanye Loves Kanye" via Island Records UK, with MDNT and SIXPM.

At the end of 2019, Rose Villain ended her contract with Republic Records and decided to be an independent artist for a while; in fall 2019, she released two singles, "Sneakers" and "It's Snowing Motherfucker", releasing a music video for the former in December 2018.

2020–2022: Italian projects
In 2020, Rose Villain she joined MeNext Agency signed a new record deal with Arista, Sony Music Italy and she released her first single in Italian, named "Bundy". A couple months later, she released the official single in Italian titled "Il Diavolo Piange"; its music video was shot in New York and was directed by Joe Mischo, also known as Brume. In the summer of 2020, she was featured on "Chico" by the Italian rapper Guè Pequeno; the single was part of his studio album Mr. Fini and also featured Luchè. "Chico" became a huge success in Italy; it peaked at number 5 on FIMI's singles charts, was certified 4× platinum, and was named as one of the ten top-selling songs in 2020 in Italy.

After the huge success of "Chico", Rose Villain released her third single in Italian, titled "Goodbye". She appeared on "Stone Cold Digital", part of A Pale Blue Dot by Dreamshade, a Swiss melodic death metal band; the album was released in March 2021. She also appeared on Corona Love Story by Mondo Marcio, released in February 2021. On 13 April 2021, she announced her collaboration with Paco Rabanne, having been chosen as testimonial for the launch of the fragrance Lady Million Fabolous.

On 4 May 2021, she released Soli with Giaime. On 2 July 2021, she released via Coulumbia Records Italy and Arista Records Italy the single Elvis featuring Guè Pequeno and SIXPM who produced also the record, she recorded the record few months back in Santo Domingo, the single contains a sample of Heartbreak Hotel of Elvis Presley. The video of the single directed by The Astronauts was released on 6 August 2021. The single to date has surpassed over 3 million plays on Spotify. On 9 July 2021, Italian DJ and producer Don Joe released his album entitled Milano Soprano, the album contains the single Kandinsky which seen Rose Villain and Italian rapper Ernia as featured artists. On 23 July 2021, Italian rapper Emis Killa released the mixtape Keta Music Vol 3, the mixtape includes the song Psycho which seen Rose Villain as featured artist. On 1 September 2021, Rose Villain was chosen by Apple Music as the Up Next Italia artist, the Apple Music initiative aimed at identifying and promoting emerging talents.

On 15 September 2021, on the occasion of 100 Years of Fashion of L'Officiel Italia, she has been selected by Italian singer Elisa as one of the most relevant female presences in Italian music. On 8 October 2021, the single Eva+Eva by Italian singer Annalisa was released, the song is contained in the album Nuda, for the occasion, the singer decided to revisit the song and launch it as a single in collaboration with another female artist of the Italian scene, so she chooses Rose Villain. The music video of Eva + Eva was released on 12 October 2021, on the YouTube channel of Warner Music Italy.  On 12 November 2021, Villain released the single Gangsta Love featuring the Italian rapper Rosa Chemical via Columbia and Arista records Italy.

On 10 December 2021, her third collaboration with Guè Pequeno was released for the song Piango sulla Lambo included in the seventh album of the rapper titled Guesus In the summer 2022 Piango Sulla Lambo is certified platinum . On the same day, Rose Villain she also the songwriter of the song Luna piena of Orietta Berti. On 18 March 2022, Italian rapper Fabri Fibra released his tenth studio album titled Caos, Rose Villain is featured on the song GoodFellas. On 22 April 2022, Italian rapper Fred De Palma released the EP PLC Tape 1, Villain is featured on the song Au Revoir together Guè. On 13 May 2022, Rose Villain released her single Michelle Pfeifer featuring Italian rapper Tony Effe. In October 2022 Michelle Pfeifer is certified gold by FIMI while in February 2023 is official platinum.

On 20 May 2022, the official soundtrack for the Italian TV series created and produced by Italian rapper Salmo was released, Rose Villain is one of the artists chosen by the rapper for the soundtrack, she's featured alongside Italian rapper Jake La Furia on the song M.S.O.M. On 28 June 2022, Rose Villain was chosen by the Italian rapper Fedez as one of the performing artists for the benefit concert Love Mi. On 22 July 2022, the collective Italian rap group SLF released the mixtape We The Squad Vol. 1 (Summer Edition), Rose Villain is featured on the remix single Travesuras together MV Killa, Yung Snapp, Vale Lambo and Fred De Palma. On 7 October 2022 Villain released her single Rari.  The official music video of "Rari", diri directed by Amedeo Zancanella, set in New York and inspired by the movie Kill Bill was released on VEVO on 13 October 2022. On 4 November 2022, Italian rapper Rondodasosa released his debut album titled Trenches baby, Villain is featured together Italian rapper Ghali on the song "Cell". On 18 November 2022 Italian rapper Ernia released his fourth studio album Io non ho paura; Rose Villain is one of the writers of the single "Bella fregatura". On 25 November 2022 Irama released the deluxe edition of his album Il giorno in cui ho smesso di pensare with three new songs, one of them is  "Canzoni tristi" where Rose Villain is the featured artist.

2023–present: Radio Gotham 

On 19 December 2022 Rose Villain announced the release of her debut album titled Radio Gotham, released on 20 January 2023. The album is anticipated by the singles Elvis, Michelle Pfeiffer and Rari released between 2021 and 2022. On January 10, 2023 she released the single Lamette featuring italian rapper Salmo. The video of Lamette directed by Amedeo Zancanella for a production of Maestro & Think Cattleya was released on January 18, 2023 a day after Rose Villain appeard on the cover of Rolling Stone Italia. On 13 January 2023 italian rapper Guè released his 8th studio album Madreperla. Rose Villain again worked with Guè, this time as songwriter for the song "Chiudi gli occhi". Radio Gotham was released officially on January 20, 2023, the album includes 14 songs featuring such as Salmo, Tedua, Geolier, Carl Brave, Elisa, Tony Effea and Guè, the album is fully produced by her husband, italian producer Sixpm, with few other producer collaboration like with, Zef, Young Miles, Stevie Aiello and HNDRC. Radio Gotham is an ode to New York; the lyrics are written by same Villain who was inspired but some personal situations The album peaked at number 5 of FIMI Album, while two songs from the album : Due Facce and Fantasmi debuted at 47 and 56 of Top Singoli. On February 10, 2023 she took part to duet show of Sanremo Music Festival 2023, together Rosa Chemical, the two covered America by Gianna Nannini and they ranked position 8 in the contest.

Musical influences 

Rose Villain is very inspired by film director such as Quentin Tarantino, David Fincher, Stanley Kubrick and Alfred Hitchcock, other than be very passionate of criminology, passion that also led her to attend courses in the United States. Those interests brought Villain to create her dark sound, which mix rock and hip hop, she also inspired by artists such as Nirvana, Guns N' Roses, The Rolling Stones, Johnny Cash, The Notorious B.I.G., 2Pac, Kanye West, Ty Dolla $ign and Kid Cudi. Villain also said that she's inspired by Italian songwriter Lucio Battisti.

Discography

Album 
 Radio Gotham (2023)

Singles
As solo artist
 "Get the Fuck Out of My Pool" (2016)
 "Geisha" (2016)
 "Kitty Kitty" (2017)
 "Don't Call the Po-Po" (2017)
 "Funeral Party" (2018)
 "It's Snowing Motherfucker" (2018)
 "Swoop!" (2019)
 "Sneakers" (2019)
 "Bundy" (2020)
 "Il Diavolo Piange" (2020)
 "Goodbye" (2020)
 "Elvis" feat. Guè Pequeno (2021)
 "Gangsta Love" feat. Rosa Chemical (2021)
 "Michelle Pfeifer" feat. Tony Effe (2022)
 "Rari" (2022)
 "Lamette" feat. Salmo (2023)

Guest appearances
 "Don Medellín" – Salmo feat. Rose Villain (2016)
 "Kanye Loves Kanye" with MDNT & SixPM (2019)
 "Chico" – Gué Pequeno feat. Rose Villain and Luchè (2020)
 "Stone Cold Digital" – Dreamshade feat. Rose Villain (2021)
 "Corona Love Story" – Mondo Marcio feat. Rose Villain (2021)
 "Soli" – Giaime feat. Rose Villain (2021)
 "Kandisky" – Don Joe feat. Ernia and Rose Villain (2021)
 "Psycho" – Emis Killa feat. Rose Villain (2021)
 "Eva + Eva" – Annalisa feat. Rose Villain (2021)
 "Piango sulla lambo" – Gué Pequeno feat. Rose Villain (2021)
 "GoodFellas" – Fabri Fibra feat. Rose Villain (2022)
 "Au Revoir" – Fred De Palma feat. Gué and Rose Villain (2022)
 "M.S.O.M" – Salmo feat. Jake La Furia and Rose Villain (2022)
 "Travesuras" – SLF feat. Rose Villain, MV Killa, Yung Snapp, Vale Lambo & Fred De Palma) (2022)
 "Cell" – Rondodasosa feat. Rose Villain and Ghali (2022)
 "Canzoni tristi" – Irama feat. Rose Villain (2022)

References

External links

1989 births
English-language singers from Italy
Living people
Musicians from Milan
Women pop singers
Italian rock singers
Italian rappers
Italian pop singers
Italian women singer-songwriters
Italian singer-songwriters
21st-century Italian singers
21st-century Italian women singers